Albert Olsson (28 November 1896 – 20 October 1977) was a Swedish footballer who played as a forward for GAIS. He competed for Team Sweden in the men's tournament at the 1920 Summer Olympics.

References

External links
 

1896 births
1977 deaths
Footballers from Gothenburg
Association football forwards
Swedish footballers
Sweden international footballers
Olympic footballers of Sweden
Footballers at the 1920 Summer Olympics
Allsvenskan players
GAIS players